Shim Eun-jung (born June 8, 1971) is a former female badminton player from South Korea.

She won the bronze medal in women's doubles with Gil Young-ah at the 1992 Barcelona Olympics.

External links
profile

South Korean female badminton players
Badminton players at the 1992 Summer Olympics
Olympic badminton players of South Korea
Olympic bronze medalists for South Korea
Olympic medalists in badminton
1971 births
Living people
Asian Games medalists in badminton
Badminton players at the 1990 Asian Games
Badminton players at the 1994 Asian Games
Medalists at the 1992 Summer Olympics
Asian Games gold medalists for South Korea
Asian Games bronze medalists for South Korea
Medalists at the 1990 Asian Games
Medalists at the 1994 Asian Games